Chad David Hernandez (born November 12, 1986), known professionally as Quiz Zilla, is an American rapper, singer, and songwriter from Portland. He released his first album, 2che, in April 2016.

He is best known for his song "What If I Kidnapped You" featuring Strange label artist Krizz Kaliko on his debut studio album "2che" (2016).

Career
On January 13, 2017, Quiz Zilla released single "Wolf in Sheep's Clothing". After releasing Wolf in Sheep's Clothing, Quiz Zilla released the music video "Words Were Never True". The video was directed by American film director Matt Alonzo. In April 2017, he released the single "Still Have Faith". The song was an inspiration to others going through hard times in life. After the release of the single "Still Have Faith", in October 2017, Quiz Zilla released his second album "Prince of the Low Life's".

Discography

Albums

Singles

References

1986 births
Living people
Musicians from Portland, Oregon